Charles Morton or Charlie Morton may refer to:

People
Charles Morton (educator) (1627–1698), English nonconformist minister, founder of a dissenting academy, later associated with Harvard College
Charles Morton (librarian) (1716–1799), English medical doctor and librarian
Charles Morton (impresario) (1819–1904), English theatre and music hall manager, known as The Father of the Halls
Charles Morton (editor) (1899–1967), Author and Associate Editor of The Atlantic Monthly
Charles Morton (actor) (1908–1966), American actor
Charles Morton (cyclist) (1916–1996), American Olympic cyclist
Charles Morton (racehorse trainer) (1855–1936), British racehorse trainer
Charlie Morton (baseball, born 1854) (Charles Hazen Morton, 1854–1921), American baseball outfielder, manager, and executive
Charlie Morton (pitcher) (born 1983), American baseball player
C. Brinkley Morton (1926–1994), bishop of the Episcopal Diocese of San Diego
Charles B. Morton (1833–1922), American politician
Charles Gould Morton (1861–1933), U.S. Army general

Military
USS General C. G. Morton (AP-138), transport ship named for Charles Gould Morton

See also
Sir Charles Forbes (Royal Navy officer) (Charles Morton Forbes, 1880–1960), British admiral